The 1979–80 season was the 71st year of football played by Dundee United, and covers the period from 1 July 1979 to 30 June 1980. United finished in third place, securing UEFA Cup football for the following season.

Match results
Dundee United played a total of 53 competitive matches during the 1979–80 season.

Legend

All results are written with Dundee United's score first.
Own goals in italics

Premier Division

Scottish Cup

League Cup

UEFA Cup

Drybrough Cup

League table

References

See also
 1979–80 in Scottish football

Dundee United F.C. seasons
Dundee United